Torbjørn Andersen (born 5 January 1957, in Grimstad) is a Norwegian politician for the Progress Party.

He was elected to the Norwegian Parliament from Aust-Agder in 1997, and has been re-elected on two occasions.

On the local level he was a member of Froland municipal council from 1991 to 1999.

References

1957 births
Living people
Members of the Storting
Progress Party (Norway) politicians
Aust-Agder politicians
People from Grimstad
21st-century Norwegian politicians
20th-century Norwegian politicians